Brasil Alberto Acosta Peña (born 21 June 1970) is a Mexican politician affiliated with the PRI. He currently serves as Congressman for the LXIV Legislature of the Mexican Congress representing the State of Mexico.

References

1970 births
Living people
Politicians from the State of Mexico
Deputies of the LXIV Legislature of Mexico
Institutional Revolutionary Party politicians
21st-century Mexican politicians
People from Texcoco, State of Mexico
Deputies of the LXII Legislature of Mexico
Chapingo Autonomous University alumni
El Colegio de México alumni
Members of the Chamber of Deputies (Mexico) for the State of Mexico